The Azteca Theater (named as the Houston Theater from 1927–1955) was a venue to perpetuate the Mexican traditions and culture. It was located in Houston Texas from the 1927 to 1955. Among other institutions at the time, this theater helped maintain traditions in Spanish, for the Latino community.

History

Sarabia Family 

Azteca Theater was one of the Mexican businesses owned by the Sarabia family aimed to preserve traditions and the language. The story of the Sarabia family in Houston goes back to 1919, when Jose Sarabia first left his native town Valle de Santiago in Guanajuato Mexico, to go to United States of America to seek better fortunes.

Jose Sarabia came from a family of 5 children; Socorro, Felipe, Maria, Jesus and himself. Born and raised in Guanajuato Mexico. He was the only one with formal education, his father and uncles had done up until second grade. He wanted to go to United States of America, in order to do that, he moved to Juarez, Mexico with 87 cents on his behalf. After saving enough money to immigrate to Houston, which was 8 dollars, he decided to leave. Once in Houston, he worked as a gardener at Rice Institute until he gathered enough money to buy a book stand on Milan Street in the 400 block.

The stand was doing well, and he convinced his brothers to move to the city to help him. In 1920 the siblings moved to help him to honor Jose's saying "In numbers there are strengths." His brother Felipe opened the second store in 711 Preston Street. However, in 1925 the store was burned.

After the fire, the Sarabia family decided to move the business to a location in 1811 Congress Avenue. That store marked the beginning of the Mexican business in Houston. In this location, they used to sell "curio-products" besides books or religious artifacts. The store was the first location to offer huaraches to the Houstonians. 
Jose Sarabia saw the need of more businesses and places to gather the Mexican community. He wanted to have a doctor, a pharmacy, entertainment places, etc., to construct a Mexican colony in the city. The pharmacists of the community would be Mr. Canales, the dentist was Dr. Estrella and for entertainment, Jose Sarabia founded the Azteca Theater.

Beginning 

As the store business flourished, Jose Sarabia founded the Azteca Theater in 1927. It was located next to "La Libreria Hispano America," which was another venue to congregate Mexican People in Houston. It flourished over the Hidalgo Theater which operated a few blocks away for a short time. Azteca Theater was recognized as one of the most important theater for the Mexican community in the Bayou City

The Theater used to appear frequently in the pages of La Gaceta Mexicana, a free magazine in Spanish. They advertised upcoming shows, but also sought the unity among the Mexican and Latino Community with add that read "Protect Azteca theater, because with it, you are protecting Mexican cinematographic industry and that way, you help your paisanos and your country."

Decline

As the 1950s started, a new era for the Mexican colonia also arrived. The Latino community started moving to the suburbs in Linndale and Denver Harvor; to the north side of town. People followed the wave of boundary expansion and Mexican American business started losing their customers. The theater started losing its audience by mid-1950. What once was the Mexican district in Congress Avenue, ceased to exist. The Azteca Theater closed its doors in 1957. The theater changed its name, but the former clientele preferred to attend the English theaters by then. Years later, the Theater was demolished, and converted in a parking lot.

Shows 
Azteca Theater presented plays as well as movies, both in Spanish Language. They always brought to Houston the most famous shows in entertainment, according to Mexican press. The shows ranged from comedy to drama, starring stars like María Félix, Pedro Armendáriz, Angelica Mendez and comedians like Cantinflas and Tin Tan. Many times the companies featured at the theater were companies that traveled from Mexico.

The Azteca Theater also served as a venue for performers to debut to the public, one of them was Cuadro Mexico Tipico as it was advertised in La Gaceta Mexicana. Other performances featured in the theater were Los Hermanos Areu who were popular among their audiences. Among the plays showcased were Sor Teresa de Jesus a drama, The Count of Monte Cristo directed by the actor Manuel Cortera, Les Misérables written by Victor Hugo. Some of the musical presentations included the famous duo Ponce y Prado. Azteca Theater also offered dance presentations like Copania Nacional Cubana directed by Rafael de Arango and Cuadro Mexico Tipico.

References 

1927 establishments in Texas
1955 disestablishments in Texas
Mexican-American culture in Houston
Mexican-American organizations
Theatres in Houston